Mohammed Medhat (Arabic:محمد مدحت) (born 10 October 1989) is a Qatari footballer.

References

External links
 

Qatari footballers
1989 births
Living people
Mesaimeer SC players
Muaither SC players
Qatar Stars League players
Qatari Second Division players
Association football midfielders